{{DISPLAYTITLE:C11H13NO2}}
The molecular formula C11H13NO2 may refer to:

 Fenmetramide
 Idrocilamide
 MDAT
 5,6-Methylenedioxy-N-methyl-2-aminoindane